Warren Daniels Kealoha (March 3, 1903 – September 8, 1972) was an American competition swimmer who was twice an Olympic gold medalist and a world record-holder.

Kealoha won the 100-meter backstroke event at the 1920 and 1924 Summer Olympics.  During his career, Kealoha set four world records, first at the 1920 Olympics and last in Honolulu in 1926, which was beaten the next day by Walter Laufer.  He was not related to Olympic swimming champion Pua Kealoha.  After retiring from swimming, Kealoha became a rancher.  He was inducted into the International Swimming Hall of Fame as an "Honor Swimmer" in 1968.

See also
 List of members of the International Swimming Hall of Fame

References

External links

 
 
 

1904 births
1972 deaths
American male backstroke swimmers
Native Hawaiian sportspeople
Olympic gold medalists for the United States in swimming
Swimmers from Honolulu
Swimmers at the 1920 Summer Olympics
Swimmers at the 1924 Summer Olympics
Medalists at the 1924 Summer Olympics
Medalists at the 1920 Summer Olympics
Saint Louis School alumni
Punahou School alumni
20th-century American people